Mollahəsənli or Mollagasanli or Molla-Gasanly may refer to:
Mollahəsənli, Dashkasan, Azerbaijan
Molla Həsənli, Jabrayil, Azerbaijan
Mollahəsənli, Masally, Azerbaijan